Multidimensional art is art that cannot be represented on a two-dimensional flat canvas. Artists create a third dimension with paper or another medium. In multidimensional art an artist can make use of virtually any items (mediums).

Materials used in multidimensional art
Many artists make use of the objects and items they find in nature and or man made items. Some artists use paper and others make use of rubber, plastic, or sculpture. Artists also use other man made items like: textiles, milk cartons, or beads.

Japanese born Nobuhiro Nakanishi puts photos on see through plastic and orders the photos in chronological order. He then mounts the photos on a wall in a line (stacking them) which gives the viewer a different perspective.

Multi-dimensional artists
Joseph Csaky
Leo Monahan
Nnenna Okore

See also
 Art movement
 Creativity techniques
 Decorative arts
 List of art media
 List of artistic media
 List of art movements
 List of most expensive paintings
 List of most expensive sculptures
 List of art techniques
 List of sculptors
 Paper art
 Paper Art Museum
 Relief art

References

Painting techniques
 
Visual arts genres
Modern art
Artistic techniques